Nguyễn Hữu Thọ (10 July 1910 – 24 December 1996) was a Vietnamese revolutionary and Chairman of Consultative Council of the National Liberation Front of South Vietnam from 6 June 1969 to 2 July 1976, and the Chairman of the National Assembly of Vietnam from 4 July 1981 to 18 June 1987.

Nguyễn Hữu Thọ began his political career in 1949, when he participated in leading positions in the protests against the French occupation of Indochina and the patrols of US warships off the coast of South Vietnam. Because of these activities he was arrested and served between 1950 and 1952 a prison sentence. During this time he gained a great reputation among the population because of his extended hunger strike against the Indochina war.

After the partition of Vietnam into communist North Vietnam and pro-US South Vietnam in 1954, he remained in his South Vietnamese homeland and subsequently co-operated with the government of President Ngô Đình Diệm until he was arrested again for attending nationwide elections to achieve reunification. With the exception of a brief break, he was between 1954 to his escape in 1961, mainly in prisons in South Vietnam. After his escape, he was first interim president and then chairman of the National Front for the Liberation of South Vietnam, which was co-founded by him on December 20, 1960 (Mặt Trận Giải Phóng Miền Nam Việt Nam,). With this liberation movement he carried out successful protests against the government of South Vietnam.

During the Vietnam War, the NLF founded the Provisional Revolutionary Government of South Vietnam in June 1969, in which Huỳnh Tấn Phát became President and he himself became Chairman of the Consultative Council. After the conquest of Saigon by a unit of the North Vietnamese Army and the Viet Cong in April 1975, he became Prime Minister of South Vietnam.

After the reunification and the founding of the Socialist Republic of Vietnam on 2 July 1976, he was one of two vice-presidents and thus deputy of Tôn Đức Thắng. At the same time he was the first mayor of Ho Chi Minh City. After Tôn Đức Thắng's death on 30 March 1980, he became acting President of Vietnam and held that post until his replacement by Trường Chinh on 4 July 1981.

He then served as Deputy Chairman of the Council of State from 1981 to 1992, Trường Chinh and Võ Chí Công. At the same time he was from 1981 to 1987 Chairman of the National Assembly (Quốc hội Việt Nam) and thus Parliament President.

Most recently, between 1988 and 1994, he was chairman of the Vietnamese Fatherland Front (Mặt trận Tổ quốc Việt Nam), the umbrella organization for mass organizations in the country.

Life and career
A French-educated lawyer in Cochinchina, Thọ was also a member of the French Section of the Workers' International (SFIO) and a participant in the Vietnamese fight for independence. He joined the Vietnamese National Popular League (or Liên Việt) in 1948, Communist Party in 1949, and was kept in detention from 1950–52. He later came to support the 1954 Geneva agreements, but opposed the government of South Vietnam's president, Ngô Đình Diệm. In August 1954, he founded the Committee in Defense of Peace and the Geneva Agreements. The committee was crushed and banned by the South Vietnamese government in November the same year, and Thọ and other members of the organization were jailed after a police raid.

He remained in detention until 1961, when he managed to escape. Free, Thọ became Chairman of the Central Committee of the National Liberation Front. In 1965, he delivered an anti-imperialist speech, a booklet was later published in English, entitled SPEECH. His title was given as: President of the Presidium of the Consultative Council of the South Viet Nam [sic] National Front for Liberation on the 5th founding anniversary of the N.F.L. In 1969, he became Chairman of the Consultative Council of the Provisional Revolutionary Government of the Republic of South Vietnam, a post he retained until South Vietnam was incorporated into North Vietnam in 1976.

In the newly re-unified Vietnam, he served as one of the vice presidents until the death of Tôn Đức Thắng, when he was named acting president (April 1980 — July 1981), a post he held until the appointment of Trường Chinh, Chairman of the Standing Committee of the National Assembly, in July 1981. On relinquishing the post of president, he assumed the role of Chairman of the National Assembly until 1987. He was vice-chairman of the council of state 1981–92. Thọ was awarded the Lenin Peace Prize (1983–84).

Nguyen died on 24 December, 1996 at Ho Chi Minh City at the age of 86.

References

External links
Interview with Nguyễn Hữu Thọ, 1981 (Video Interview) WGBH Media Library & Archives

1910 births
1996 deaths
People from Long An Province
Presidents of Vietnam
Vice presidents of Vietnam
Chairmen of the Standing Committee of the National Assembly (Vietnam)
Lenin Peace Prize recipients
French Section of the Workers' International politicians
Members of the 8th Central Committee of the Communist Party of Vietnam
20th-century Vietnamese lawyers
Vietnamese communists
Vietnamese nationalists
Vietnamese revolutionaries